An award, sometimes called a distinction, is something given to a recipient as a token of recognition of excellence in a certain field. When the token is a medal, ribbon or other item designed for wearing, it is known as a decoration.

An award may be described by three aspects: 1) who is given 2) what 3) by whom, all varying according to purpose.

The recipient is often an individual, such as a student or athlete, or a representative of a group of people, be it an organisation, a sports team or a whole country. The award item may be a decoration, that is an insignia suitable for wearing, such as a medal, badge, or rosette (award). It can also be a token object such as certificate, diploma, championship belt, trophy, or plaque. The award may also be or be accompanied by a title of honor, as well as an object of direct value such as prize money or a scholarship.

An award may be conferred as a state decoration by sovereign state, dynasty or other public authority (see fount of honour), or else a private organisation or individual. The latter may also include ecclesiastical authorities, such as in the case of ecclesiastical awards.

For example, the Nobel Prize recognizes contributions to society, while the Pulitzer prize honors literary achievements. An award may also simply be a public acknowledgment of excellence, without any tangible token or prize. 

Awards for sports tournaments often take the form of cups, following a tradition harking back to the ancient Greek tripod given to winners in athletic contests. The Stanley Cup is a modern example. In contrast, awards for employee recognition often take the form of plaques or crystal pieces. An award may carry a monetary prize given to the recipient.

Finally, an award may recognize participation rather than victory. There is controversy regarding the appropriateness of participation awards for students in United States schools.

A relative field to awards is phal eristics, an auxiliary sciences of history auxiliary science of history and numismatics which studies orders, fraternity fraternities and Award or decoration award items, such as medals and other decorations.

See also
Lists of awards
Military awards and decorations
Civil awards and decorations
Ecclesiastical award
Ecclesiastical decoration
Prize
Title
Order of precedence
Decoration
Order (distinction)

References

Further reading
 

 
Award items
Cultural conventions